Anchonoderus is a genus of beetles in the family Carabidae, containing the following species:

 Anchonoderus apicalis Reiche, 1843 
 Anchonoderus binotatus Reiche, 1843 
 Anchonoderus concinnus Reiche, 1843 
 Anchonoderus cupripennis Liebke, 1939 
 Anchonoderus darlingtoni Liebherr, 1988 
 Anchonoderus erosus Putzeys, 1878 
 Anchonoderus eximius (Audouin & Brulle, 1836) 
 Anchonoderus femoratus Putzeys, 1878 
 Anchonoderus fulvipennis Bates, 1891 
 Anchonoderus horni Csiki, 1931 
 Anchonoderus humeralis (Bates, 1883) 
 Anchonoderus infirmus Bates, 1884 
 Anchonoderus jamaicensis Liebherr, 1988 
 Anchonoderus montanus Liebke, 1951 
 Anchonoderus myops Reiche, 1843 
 Anchonoderus quadrinotatus G.Horn, 1878 
 Anchonoderus reichei Putzeys, 1878 
 Anchonoderus roedingeri Liebke, 1951  
 Anchonoderus rugatus Reiche, 1843 
 Anchonoderus scabricollis Bates, 1871 
 Anchonoderus schaefferi Liebke, 1928 
 Anchonoderus subaeneus Reiche, 1843  
 Anchonoderus subtilis Bates, 1871 
 Anchonoderus tucumanus Liebke, 1939 
 Anchonoderus undatus Chaudoir, 1850 
 Anchonoderus unicolor Chaudoir, 1850

References

Lebiinae